The Circle Bridge (Danish: Cirkelbroen) is a bicycle and pedestrian bridge spanning the southern mouth of Christianshavn Canal in the Christianshavn area of central Copenhagen, Denmark. It connects Applebys Plads to the south with Christiansbro to the north. The bridge was designed by Olafur Eliasson.

Construction
 
The bridge was a gift from the Nordea Foundation. It opened on 22 August 2015.

Description 
The bridge consists of five round decks with masts of different heights. The masts are held up by 118 metal cables, giving the bridge a resemblance to a series of sailing yachts. The form highlights the reverse slope of the bridge's rails, which are made of wood from the Brazilian guariuba tree (Clarisia racemosa).

See also 
 
 
 
 List of bridges in Denmark
 List of bridges in Copenhagen

References

External links

 Cirkelbroen Bridge / Studio Olafur Eliasson ArchDaily.
 Cirkelbroen by Olafur Eliasson  De Zeen.
 Cirkelbroen, 2015 Olafur Eliasson.
 

Bridges in Copenhagen
Swing bridges in Denmark
Cyclist bridges in Denmark
Bridges completed in 2015
2015 establishments in Denmark